Olive, Again is a novel by the American author Elizabeth Strout. The book was published by Random House on October 15, 2019. It is a sequel to Olive Kitteridge (2008), which won the 2009 Pulitzer Prize for Fiction. In November 2019, the novel was selected for the revival of Oprah's Book Club. Similar to the first novel, Olive, Again takes the form of 13 short stories that are interrelated but discontinuous in terms of narrative. It follows Olive Kitteridge from her seventies into her eighties.

Stories

"Arrested"
Jack Kennison, a seventy-four-year-old widower and retired Harvard professor, drives to Portland to buy whiskey to avoid the possibility of running into Olive, who he has since separated from, at the grocery store in Crosby. Jack is pulled over by the police and given a ticket for speeding.

"Labor"
Olive attends a "stupid" baby shower. One of the pregnant guests goes into labor and Olive attempts to drive her to the hospital, but finds herself having to deliver the stranger's baby in the back of her own car.

"Cleaning"
Kayley Callaghan is a fourteen-year-old girl living in Crosby whose father died two years earlier. She begins to find a passion for playing the piano, which her father played. While cleaning the house of Mrs. Ringrose for money, Kayley begins experiencing sexual feelings and touches her breasts. She opens her eyes to find Mr. Ringrose watching her, urging her to continue. She agrees and later finds an envelope filled with money left for her by Mr. Ringrose when she leaves. She and Mr. Ringrose continue their unspoken arrangement every time she cleans the house. When her mother eventually finds the envelopes of money, Kayley instead hides it in the piano. One day, she comes home to find her mother sold the piano since she stopped playing it. Mrs. Ringrose tells Kayley she is no longer needed for cleaning. In the last days of summer, Kayley learns from Olive Kitteridge that Mr. Ringrose's behavior has become abnormal and he is being put in a nursing home. Two days before Kayley begins high school, she rides her bike near the nursing home and feels a longing for Mr. Ringrose.

"Motherless Child"
Olive invites her son Christopher, a podiatrist living in New York, to finally come visit Crosby with his wife, Ann, and their four children. Olive reveals her plans to marry Jack and Christopher expresses disbelief and anger. When Jack comes to meet Christopher and his family the next day, Christopher expresses anger at his mother but is quickly chastised by his wife. Christopher immediately apologizes and appears "pale as paper", though Olive feels pity for her son. Olive recalls yelling at her late husband Henry in public similar to how Ann yelled at Christopher. Olive reflects that she has "failed on a colossal level" with both Henry and their son Christopher and has "lived her life as though blind."

"Helped"
Suzanne Larkin returns to Crosby, where her childhood home recently burned down with her father having died in the process. Suzanne finds a platonic consolation through conversations with her father's lawyer, Bernie. Bernie's compassion and empathy make a grieving Suzanne feel "as though huge windows above her had been smashed—the way the firemen must have smashed the windows of her childhood home— and now, here above her and around her, was the whole wide world right there, available to her once again." Bernie feels a similar connection to Suzanne, and is astonished by her "uncorrupted" nature.

"Light"
Olive encounters a former student of hers, Cindy Coombs, while grocery shopping. Coombs, who previously worked as a librarian, is gravely ill. Olive visits her unannounced one day and continues to see her afterwards. The two discuss mortality, and Olive confesses her "pretty awful" treatment of Henry. She says that she has become "a tiny — tiny — bit better as a person" but feels sick that Henry is not alive to receive her that way. The story's title refers to Cindy and Olive's mutual appreciation for the light in February: "how at the end of each day the world seemed cracked open and the extra light made its way across the stark trees."

"The Walk"
Sixty-nine-year-old Denny Pelletier is walking alone one night in December in Crosby. He thinks something is wrong with his children but can't think of the answer. He reminisces about his childhood, his own children, his first love Dorothy Paige, and finally his wife Marie Levesque. Denny stumbles upon a man bent over a bench and calls the police, who arrive and intervene by injecting him with Naloxone. Denny walks home and realizes it is with himself that something is wrong, that he had been "saddened by the waning of his life, and yet it was not over." When he returns home and is greeted by his wife Marie.

"Pedicure"
Olive gets her first pedicure. Jack contemplates his late wife, Betsy, and his affair with Elaine Croft. He thinks of and is frightened by "how much of his life he had lived
without knowing who he was or what he was doing."

"Exiles"
Jim, Bob and Susan Burgess — the siblings from The Burgess Boys (2013) — reunite in nearby Shirley Falls. The brothers' wives, Helen and Margaret, do not like one another. One evening, after drinking wine, Helen finds herself falling down the stairs and breaking several bones. Following Helen's accident, Margaret confesses to her husband that "I couldn't stand her and she knew it, Bob. And I feel terrible." It is also revealed that Bob Burgess and his wife know Olive.

"The Poet"
Olive, now eighty-two years old, drives to the coffee shop in Crosby. She runs into a former student of hers, Andrea L'Rieux, who went on to become the United States Poet Laureate. Olive and Jack take a trip to Oslo, Norway. Later, in autumn, Jack dies in his sleep beside her. The following May, Olive is anonymously sent a poem written by Andrea that is based on their encounter. She is initially offended by Andrea's characterization of Olive as lonely. However, Olive eventually admits, "Andrea had gotten it better than she had, the experience of being another."

"The End of the Civil War Days"
Married couple Fergus and Ethel MacPherson live on the outskirts of Crosby and have been married for forty-two years. Though, the two have barely spoken to each other in the last thirty-five years. They have lived with yellow duct tape separating their house ever since Fergus had an affair. Their silence and separation is somewhat broken when their daughter, Laurie, returns from Portland to tell them she has become a dominatrix and is the star of a new documentary. The story draws parallels between the performance aspect of Fergus' Civil War reenactments with their daughter's work as a dominatrix.

"Heart"
Olive, eighty-three years old, suffers a heart attack in her hairdresser's driveway. She is assigned round-the-clock care in her home by nurse's aides. Olive befriends two of the nurses: Betty, a Trump supporter, and Halima, the daughter of a Somali refugee. Christopher visits Olive frequently and eventually helps her get into Maple Tree Apartments, an assisted living facility.

"The Friend"
In Maple Tree Apartments, Olive befriends Isabelle Daignault — the mother from Amy and Isabelle (1999). The two form a close friendship, caring for one another. Isabelle reflects with regret and shame for cutting off her daughter's hair, saying to Olive, "The memory haunts me." Olive's oldest age mentioned in the novel is 86.

Reception
The review aggregator website Book Marks, which assigns individual ratings to book reviews from mainstream literary critics, noted that the novel generally received rave feedback, based on a total of 28 reviews: 18 "Rave" reviews, 10 "Positive" reviews, and 2 "Mixed" reviews. Kirkus Reviews praised the novel, writing, "Beautifully written and alive with compassion, at times almost unbearably poignant. A thrilling book in every way." While Publishers Weekly called the novel "cohesive" and wrote, "Strout again demonstrates her gift for zeroing in on ordinary moments in the lives of ordinary people to highlight their extraordinary resilience." In her review for The Washington Post, Joan Frank gave the novel a positive review, calling it "arguably better than the original" and writing, "Sentences flow in simplest words and clearest order — yet line after line hammers home some of the most complex human rawness you'll ever read."

References

Novels by Elizabeth Strout
2019 American novels
Random House books
Novels set in Maine
Novels set in Oslo
Works about old age
Sexuality in novels
Novels about substance abuse
Juvenile sexuality in books